Jaromír Štětina (born 6 April 1943) is a Czech journalist, writer and politician who served as a Member of the European Parliament from 2014 to 2019 for the Czech Republic, representing TOP 09. He is also known as a war correspondent from the conflict areas of the former Soviet Union countries.

Biography
Štětina was born in Prague in 1943. From 1961-1967, he studied at the Prague University of Economics and Business. 

From 1965 until 1968, Štětina was a member of the Communist Party of Czechoslovakia. In 1968, he started working as a journalist for the newspaper Mladá Fronta, and his time there coincided with the Soviet occupation of Czechoslovakia, during which the Soviet army seized control of the newspaper's offices. Štětina was subsequently fired due to his disagreement with the Warsaw Pact occupation. 

He subsequently worked as a geodesist, and while working, studied geology long-distance at Charles University in Prague, during which he organised 25 geologic or sport tours to Siberia and Asia. During the same years, Štětina wrote his most famous book, S matyldou po Indu, on the topic of rafting.

In 1987, he started engaging in public speaking. In 1989, he co-founded a syndicate of journalists, ultimately resuming his work as a journalist, at the re-established Lidové noviny. In 1990 he began working as a foreign correspondent in Moscow, where he covered numerous conflicts in the former Soviet Union. In 1992, he founded the Lidových novin foundation. During 1993-94 he was editor-in-chief of Lidové noviny. In 1994, he founded the journalism agency Epicentrum, dedicated to war reporting, with fellow journalist Petra Procházková.

Štětina has specialised in military conflicts, covering over 20 different conflict zones in Europe, Asia and Africa. He has published 10 books, as well as dozens of documentaries, and many articles.

Political career
In the 2004 elections to the Czech Senate, Štětina ran as an independent candidate under the umbrella of the Green Party. He won the election, becoming the senator for the Prague 10 district.

From 2014 to 2019, Štětina served as a Member of the European Parliament representing TOP 09. On 11 February 2019, he founded his own political party, Europe Together, to contest the 2019 European Parliament elections. He said that the party would join the European People's Party if elected. Europe Together eventually finished 15th, with 0.59% of the vote, and did not win any seats.

Štětina is a founding signatory of the Prague Declaration on European Conscience and Communism.

Awards 
Honours and awards received by Štětina include:
 State Order of merit awarded by the Czech Republic
 Ferdinand Peroutka Prize
 Rudolf Medek Prize
 Prize awarded by Johns Hopkins University, USA
 Prize of František Kriegel

Notes

External links
 Štětina's website 

1943 births
Living people
Politicians from Prague
Members of the Senate of the Czech Republic
Czech journalists
Recipients of Medal of Merit (Czech Republic)
MEPs for the Czech Republic 2014–2019
Prague University of Economics and Business alumni
Charles University alumni
War correspondents